Shuricheh-ye Olya (also Romanized as Shūrīcheh-ye ‘Olyā; also known as Shūrījeh-ye ‘Olyā) is a village in Pol Khatun Rural District, Marzdaran District, Sarakhs County, Razavi Khorasan Province, Iran. At the 2006 census, its population was 488, in 96 families.

References 

Populated places in Sarakhs County